Burla is a commune located in Suceava County, Romania. It is composed of a single village, Burla, part of Volovăț Commune until 2004, when it was split off.

References

Communes in Suceava County
Localities in Southern Bukovina